Unto Kalervo Tanskanen (born. 1931) is a Finnish diplomat and lawyer. He has been Finnish Ambassador  to Hanoi from 1974 to 1977, and to Nairobi and to Addis Ababa from 1977 to 1980, and to Tehran and to Islamabad from 1980 to 1983, and since 1983 a negotiating official in the Ministry for Foreign Affairs.

References

Ambassadors of Finland to Kenya
Ambassadors of Finland to Ethiopia
Ambassadors of Finland to Iran
Ambassadors of Finland to Pakistan
1931 births
Ambassadors of Finland to Vietnam
Living people